Ocio is a hamlet in the municipality of Zambrana, in the province of Álava, Basque Country (Spain).

Location 
The town is near the Ebro river, being crossed by its tributary the Inglares. Its natural access road is through the A-3126 road, which starts and rises from the N-124, in the nearby Zambrana. The town is located in the valley of the Inglares river at an altitude of 526 meters above sea level at its lowest point and is delimited on its north side by the Portilla mountain range and on the south by the foothills of the Toloño, initially drawing attention to its closest cliff (Lanos), which gives its castle its official name  and is an emblem of the place.

In 1919 it became part of the municipality of Berganzo and since 1925 it belongs to Zambrana, together with Berganzo and Portilla.

References 

Populated places in Álava